Risky Business is a 1983 American film.

Risky Business may also refer to:

 Risky Business (1920 film), a 1920 American silent film starring Lillian Lawrence
 Risky Business (1926 film), a 1926 American film starring Vera Reynolds
 Risky Business (1939 film), a 1939 American film
 Risky Business (soundtrack), from the 1983 film
 "Risky Business" (House), a 2011 episode of House
 "Risky Business" (A Different World), an episode of the sitcom A Different World
 "The Risky Business", an episode of The O.C. on television
 "Risky business", an episode of The Ascent of Money: A Financial History of the World
 Risky Business, the English title of the French 1967 film Les risques du métier
 Risky Business, a climate change awareness project chaired by Michael Bloomberg and Henry Paulson

See also 
 
 Frisky Business (disambiguation)
 Kinky Business, a 1985 pornographic-film variation on the 1983 film's plot
 "Ruskie Business", an episode of the American television series Veronica Mars